Edward P. Kastelic (born January 29, 1964) is a Canadian retired professional ice hockey player. Kastelic played for the Washington Capitals and Hartford Whalers of the National Hockey League (NHL).

Kastelic was drafted in 1982 by the Washington Capitals.  He would play in Europe for several years before retiring from active professional play. Kastelic was featured as one of the 30 profiles in "Hockey's Toughest Talk" by Brian D'Ambrosio.

After his retirement, he moved to Phoenix, Arizona. He becamea youth hockey coach and fitness instructor, teaching his own "Propulse" program. His son Mark Kastelic is a professional ice hockey player.

Career statistics

References

External links

Profile at hockeydraftcentral.com

1964 births
Living people
Binghamton Rangers players
Binghamton Whalers players
Canadian ice hockey right wingers
Canadian people of Slovenian descent
Hartford Whalers players
HDD Olimpija Ljubljana players
London Knights players
Moncton Golden Flames players
Phoenix Roadrunners (IHL) players
Ice hockey people from Toronto
Washington Capitals draft picks
Washington Capitals players
Canadian expatriate ice hockey players in Slovenia